Spool was a free social bookmarking program and social network that was launched in October 2011 at TechCrunch Disrupt. The service allowed users to cache a webpage, including any media on the page, for offline consumption on any mobile device. Spool raised over $1 million from angel investors in January 2012. Facebook, Inc. acquired Spool in July 2012, in what was rumored to be a very competitive process.

References

Meta Platforms acquisitions
Social bookmarking
2012 mergers and acquisitions